Alert Bay is a village on Cormorant Island, near the town of Port McNeill on northeast Vancouver Island, in the Regional District of Mount Waddington, British Columbia, Canada.

Demographics 

Up to a half of the village's residents are First Nations people. The village is in traditional Kwakwakaʼwakw territory. Two Indian Reserves take up the rest of Cormorant Island, Alert Bay 1 on the east side of the island, Alert Bay 1A on the west.

Facilities and features
Alert Bay has a credit union, grocery store, museums, a traditional "big house", a hospital, an Royal Canadian Mounted Police station, a drug store, a post office, three restaurants and retail gift shops, a BC liquor store, a Royal Canadian Legion, a pub, doctors' offices, a dental clinic, a drug and alcohol treatment centre, and four automated teller machines (one in the bank, legion hall, restaurant and one inside Bayside Pub).

The town has three airports (Alert Bay Airport, a public airport, and the Alert Bay Water Aerodrome). There is a boat harbour and a BC Ferries terminal with service to Sointula and Port McNeill.

There is Alert Bay Elementary School, part of School District 85 Vancouver Island North, for children in kindergarten and grades 1 to 7 and the T'lisalagi'lakw School (independent) owned and operated by the ʼNamgis First Nation for children in nursery, kindergarten and grades 1 to 7. Students in grades 8 to 12 travel by foot or ferry / water taxi to a school in nearby Port McNeill on Vancouver Island, along with students from Sointula on nearby Malcolm Island and others on North Island.

There is also one campground and an ecological park consisting of a cedar swamp and a small area of old-growth trees.

Alert Bay is home to the world's tallest totem pole.

U'mista Cultural Centre
In 1921, the Government of Canada, in an effort to stop the potlatch custom of dance, song, and wealth distribution under Section 116 of the Indian Act, confiscated many items including wooden masks, copper shields, and dance regalia. During the 1970s and 80s, the Kwakwakaʼwakw regained their possessions after long negotiations. The returned artifacts are housed in a museum at the U'mista Cultural Centre.

Origin of the name
The settlement was named c.1860 after the Royal Navy ship HMS Alert, which conducted survey operations in the area.

Climate 
Alert Bay has an oceanic climate (Köppen Cfb) with a strong drying tendency in summer. Alert Bay is heavily moderated by the proximity to the Pacific Ocean and being located in the pathway of low-pressure systems from said ocean, heavy annual rainfall ensues. Winter is the wettest season, but snowfall is rare due to the average lows above freezing.

Geology
Volcanic features in the geography around Alert Bay are part of the Alert Bay Volcanic Belt. It appears to have been active in Miocene and Pliocene times. No Holocene eruptions are known, and volcanic activity in the belt has likely ceased.

Notable people

 Brothers Bing Chew Wong and Frank Bing Wong - Chinese Canadian Second World War veterans raised in Alert Bay and Vancouver; Bing was a Vancouver accountant who helped Chinese and First Nations clients with accounting needs

References

External links

Populated places in the Regional District of Mount Waddington
Villages in British Columbia